Justin Warsylewicz (born 19 October 1985 in Regina, Saskatchewan) is a Canadian speedskater.

In February 2004, at the age of eighteen, he became Canadian All Round Champion after winning the World Junior Championships earlier that year. His win left the talented Dutchman Sven Kramer behind him in second place. The student of kinesiology missed the first half of the 2004/2005 season when he was diagnosed with a heart irregularity. This required catheter ablation procedures performed by Dr. L. Brent Mitchell at the Foothills Medical Centre in Calgary on November 17 and December 8. Successful outcomes of the procedures allowed Justin to compete in the Canadian All Round Championship at the end of December, and successfully defended his national title.  Justin subsequently participated in the 2006 Winter Olympics in Turin, winning a silver medal in men's team pursuit speed skating.

As of November 2013 and through the lead-up to the 2014 Olympic Winder Games, the Libin Cardiovascular Institute of Alberta, that had treated Justin in 2004, has been his sponsor.

External links

 Photos of Justin Warsylewicz

References

1985 births
Living people
Canadian male speed skaters
Sportspeople from Regina, Saskatchewan
Speed skaters at the 2006 Winter Olympics
Olympic silver medalists for Canada
Olympic medalists in speed skating
Medalists at the 2006 Winter Olympics
21st-century Canadian people